This is a list of the busiest airports in South America.

In graphic

2022 South America busiest airports by passenger traffic

2021 South America busiest airports by passenger traffic

2020 South America busiest airports by passenger traffic

2019 South America busiest airports by passenger traffic

2018 South America busiest airports by passenger traffic

2013 South America busiest airports by passenger traffic

2011 South America busiest airports by passenger traffic

2010 South America busiest airports by passenger traffic

2009 South America busiest airports by passenger traffic

2008 South America busiest airports by passenger traffic

See also 
List of the busiest airports in Latin America
List of airports in the Caribbean
List of airports in Central America

References

Aviation in South America
South America
 Busiest